Holland's Leaguer may refer to:

 Holland's Leaguer (brothel)
 Holland's Leaguer (play)